Turning the Tables is a 1919 American silent comedy film directed by Elmer Clifton, written by Wells Hastings and Lois Zellner, and starring Dorothy Gish, Raymond Cannon, George Fawcett, Eugenie Besserer, Kate Toncray, and Rhea Haines. It was released on November 2, 1919, by Paramount Pictures.

Plot

Cast
 Dorothy Gish as Doris Pennington
 Raymond Cannon as Monty Feverill
 George Fawcett as Prof. Freno Palmer
 Eugenie Besserer as Mrs. Feverill
 Kate Toncray as Dr. Spinks
 Rhea Haines as Ruth Strong
 Porter Strong as Dr. Eddy
 Norman McNeil as Swipes Conroy

References

External links

 
 
 lobby poster
  2nd lobby poster

1919 films
1910s English-language films
Silent American comedy films
1919 comedy films
Paramount Pictures films
Films directed by Elmer Clifton
American black-and-white films
American silent feature films
1910s American films